Tyka Evene Nelson (born May 18, 1960) is an American singer. She is the daughter of jazz musician John L. Nelson (1916–2001) and  jazz singer Mattie Della Shaw (1933–2002), and the sister of Prince (1958–2016). In addition, she has seven half-siblings.

She has released four albums, and reached No. 33 on the Billboards Hot R&B/Hip-Hop Songs chart in July 1988 with "Marc Anthony's Tune", produced by Larry Graham. She wrote the song "Marc Anthony's Tune" because she had a crush on the singer.

She accepted Prince's American Music Award for Top Soundtrack following his death in 2016.

Nelson is married to Maurice Phillips. She has 6 children.

Discography
 1988: Royal Blue (Cooltempo)
 1992: Moon Yellow, Red Sky (CMC International Records)
 2008: A Brand New Me
 2011: Hustler
 TBA: Enlightened (EP)

References

1960 births
20th-century African-American women singers
20th-century American singers
21st-century American singers
Living people
Musicians from Minnesota
American soul singers
20th-century American women singers
21st-century American women singers
21st-century African-American women singers